Moti Lal Kemmu (born 1933) is an Indian contemporary playwright from Jammu & Kashmir. He was born in Srinagar into a Kashmiri Pandit family and attended Jammu and Kashmir University. His plays include Nagar Udas, Teen Asangati Aikanki (1968), Lal Drayas Lol Re (1972), Trunove (1970), Tshai (1973), Natak Truche (1980), Tota Tol Aina (1985).

Awards and honours 
He received the Sahitya Akademi Award in 1982 for his contribution to Kashmiri Literature as a playwright.

He won the Padma Shri award in 2012.

References

Kashmiri people
Kashmiri Hindus
Kashmiri Pandits
Indian people of Kashmiri descent
2018 deaths
Recipients of the Padma Shri in arts
People from Srinagar
20th-century Indian dramatists and playwrights
Dramatists and playwrights from Jammu and Kashmir
Recipients of the Sahitya Akademi Award in Kashmiri
1933 births
Recipients of the Sangeet Natak Akademi Award